13eaver is the debut album from Stoner rock band Beaver. It is out of print.

Track listing
 "Piece of Mind"
 "Drown"
 "Dolphinity"
 "Centaur"
 "This Room"
 "Decisions in Time"
 "One Eye is King"
 "Ripe Fruit"
 "Snakes & Ladders"
 "538810"
 "Deep Hibernation"
 "Miss Interpreter
 "Infinity"

Credits
Produced by Beaver & Jacques de Haard
Recorded at Via Ritmo, Rotterdam, spring 1995
Engineered by Jacques de Haard
Mastered by Dr. Steentjes
Re-mastered in 1999 by Jacques de Haard
All songs by Beaver

References 

1996 debut albums
Beaver (band) albums